Beatdown is a strategy video game developed by Soar Software and published by Hot-B in 1999.

Reception

The game received unfavorable reviews according to the review aggregation website GameRankings.

References

External links
 Info for Beatdown from Computer Games Strategy Plus
 

1999 video games
Organized crime video games
Strategy video games
Video games developed in the United States
Windows games
Windows-only games